The All-Ireland Senior B Hurling Championship of 1978 was the fifth staging of Ireland's secondary hurling knock-out competition.  Antrim won the championship, beating London 1–16 to 3–7 in the final at Croke Park, Dublin.

The championship

Format

Home final: (1 match) The winners of the two semi-finals contest this game.  One team is eliminated at this stage while the winners advance to the 'proper' All-Ireland final.

Final: (1 match) The winners of the All-Ireland 'home' final join London to contest this game.  One team is eliminated at this stage while the winners are allowed to participate in the All-Ireland SHC quarter-final.

Results

Semi-finals

Home final

Final

References

 Donegan, Des, The Complete Handbook of Gaelic Games (DBA Publications Limited, 2005).

1978
Hurling
B